The men's heptathlon at the 2022 World Athletics Indoor Championships took place on 18 and 19 March 2022.

Results

60 metres
The 60 metres were started at 9:56.

Long jump
The Long jump was started at 10:40.

Shot put
The shot put was started at 12:06.

High jump
The high jump was started at 19:05.

60 metres hurdles
The 60 metres hurdles were started at 9:33.

Pole vault
Pole vault was held on 19 March at 10:45.

1000 metres
The 1000 metres was held on 19 March at 19:40.

Final standings
After all events.

References

Pentathlon
Combined events at the World Athletics Indoor Championships